HMS Virulent was a V-class submarine of the Royal Navy. She was built during the Second World War as part of the second batch (18 in number) of V-class submarines ordered on 21 May 1942.

She was built by Vickers-Armstrong (Newcastle-on-Tyne), being laid down on 30 March 1943, launched on 23 May 1944, and finally commissioned on 1 October 1944.

Fate 
Virulent was lent to the Hellenic Navy as Argonaftis (U15) from 29 May 1946 until 3 October 1958. She was intended to be towed from Malta to the River Tyne. She broke adrift from the tow on 15 December 1958 and became stranded on the northern Spanish coast. She was then found and towed by two Spanish trawlers, the frigate Hernán Cortés and the patrol boat V-18 to Pasajes on 6 January 1959. Sold to a Spanish scrap company in spring 1961, she was eventually scrapped in April 1961 at Pasajes.

Notes

References 
 
 HMS Virulent at Uboat.net

 

British V-class submarines
Ships built on the River Tyne
1944 ships
World War II submarines of the United Kingdom
Submarines of the Hellenic Navy
Maritime incidents in 1958
Maritime incidents in Spain
Ships built by Vickers Armstrong